Jordan Dingle (born July 14, 2000) is an American college basketball player for the Penn Quakers of the Ivy League.

Early life and high school
Dingle grew up in Valley Stream, New York and initially attended Lawrence Woodmere Academy. He transferred to Blair Academy, a boarding school in Blairstown, New Jersey, prior to the start of his junior year.

College career
Dingle became a starter during his freshman season and was named the Ivy League Rookie of the Year after averaging 13.5 points, 2.2 assists, and 3.4 rebounds per games. He took a leave of absence from Penn during his true sophomore year after the 2020–21 season was cancelled in the Ivy League due to the COVID-19 pandemic. Dingle was named first-team All-Ivy League in 2022 after he averaged 20.9 points, 2.4 assists, and 3.6 rebounds over 26 games. Dingle was named the Ivy League Player of the Year as a junior.

Personal life
Dingle's father, Dana Dingle, played college basketball at UMass and was a starter for the Minutemen in the 1996 Final Four.

References

External links
Penn Quakers bio

Living people
African-American basketball players
American men's basketball players
Basketball players from New York (state)
Blair Academy alumni
Lawrence Woodmere Academy alumni
Penn Quakers men's basketball players
People from Valley Stream, New York